Horsman's Place was an estate situated in Dartford, Kent, England. For several centuries the main residence was an early Elizabethan mansion. Thomas Horsman, the estate's namesake, inherited the mansion by marriage in 1420.

Description
The Elizabethan mansion was built on the site of an existing building by John Bere in 1551. After the estate had been sold off in small lots and the mansion had suffered years of neglect, it was demolished and replaced by a smaller house in the late 18th century.

The principal front of the mansion faced the west, and was originally approached by an avenue of lime trees from Short-Hill, near the Spital-house. Some of the tree stumps remained until James Storey's time (1780s). A long gallery ran along the whole front of the mansion, into which the several apartments opened. A large court in front of the mansion nearly extended across the present street, rendering the road narrow and inconvenient; but on rebuilding the house, James Storey set back his walls in a line with the rest of the street. Hasted says on the gateway, entering the court, were the initials of the founder, J. B. [John Bere] and the date 1551.

At the time it was demolished a record of this family appeared on an oaken beam, to the following effect, ". On the pulling down of the gate-house, a part of the materials, with some of the letters of the inscription, were purchased by an inhabitant of Horton Kirby, and affixed on the walls of his house, where they were still to be seen in 1844.

Ownership
In the reign of Edward II (1307–1327), the manor was owned by Thomas de Luda. Towards the end of the reign of Edward III (1327–1733) it had passed to John Horsman, and it is likely that he built a large new dwelling. It is after this building that the manor gained its name.

Tomas Horsman, John Horsman's son and heir, died without children at the beginning of the reign of Henry VI. So, he willed the estate to his widow Margaret. She remarried to —— Shardlow, and upon her death c. 1640  bequeathed it to her kinsman Thomas Brown, whose daughter and sole heir Katherine, annexed it to the patrimony of Robert Blague, one of the Barons of the Exchequer. They had a son Barnaby Blague who inherited the estate and sold it to John Bere in 1541 (the 33rd year of the reign of Henry VIII).

In 1551 John Bere rebuilt the mansion and gatehouse, and on the latter, inscribed his initials, and the time of its erection. He married twice. His first wife was Alice, daughter and heir of William Nysell, of Wrotham; his second wife, was Joan, or Johanna Egglefield, by whom he left two sons and two daughters. His daughter Ann became the wife of Christopher Twisleton of Barley, Yorkshire; his other daughter Dorothy died unmarried. His eldest son Henry inherited Horsmans Place but died two years later and the estate passed to his brother Nicholas. Edward Bere, his younger son and last remaining descendant, died leaving the estate to John Twisleton, a grandson son and direct living descendant of Alice, aunt of Edward Bere. John Twisleton was created a baronet by Lord Protector Oliver Cromwell in 1658, but that baronetcy passed into oblivion at the restoration.

John Twisleton had four wives. By his third wife, Elizabeth (died 1762), eldest daughter and co-heir of James, Viscount Saye and Sele, he left an only daughter, first the wife of George Twisleton, of Wormesly in Yorkshire, and secondly of Robert Mignon. John Twisleton died in 1682, having bequeathed this manor and seat to his nephew, John, eldest son of his younger brother Philip (during the English Civil War a Roundhead colonel).

This John (died 28 July 1721) usually resided at Horsmans Place, and throughout his long life appears to have taken much interest in the welfare of Dartford. The estate passed to his nephew John Twisleton (died in 1757 without issue). There was a court case between two relatives of the last deceased owner, Thomas Cockshutt and  John Twisleton (died 1763) over possession of Horsmans Place. The case was tried at Maidstone, in 1758, and John Twisleton was adjudged to be entitled to the estate in Dartford.

John Twisleton died leaving three sons, the eldest of whom was killed in Germany the same year. His brothers became entitled to their father’s estates, as heirs in gavelkind. On a partition of the estates, Horsmans Place in Dartford fell to the share of the second son, Thomas, a colonel in the guards, afterwards Lord Saye and Sele. Thomas sold Horsmans Place in 1768 with the rest of the estates in Dartford, to Thomas Williams and Thomas Smith.

The property comprised a great number of houses and a considerable portion of the lands in Dartford. Williams and Smith broke up the holding and sold it in separate portions at a great profit. They sold the mansion to Richard Leigh (died 1772), serjeant-at-law, upon whose death the house was inherited by his son Richard.

Richard Leigh the younger waited until his mother vacated the premises in 1780 and then while it was advertised to be sold or let the mansion remained unoccupied, falling into a dilapidated state. It was rented in 1784 by James Storey, originally an artillery driver, who came to Dartford while the camp existed on Dartford Heath. Being a very industrious man, he was employed and patronised by several gentlemen in the town and commenced a market garden business in the garden opposite Horsmans Place. He resided in the house for about a year before sub-letting it to the Rev. William Wiseman, master of the Grammar School. When Wiseman left, Storey moved back in, but finding the premises much too large and greatly dilapidated, he obtained Mr. Leigh's consent to replace the mansion with a house of smaller dimensions better adapted for his business. Eventually, James Story purchased the house and remaining land.

Notes

References
 

Attribution

Dartford